Mammillaria senilis is a species of cacti in the tribe Cacteae. It is native to Mexico, where it is found in the states of Chihuahua, Durango, Jalisco, Nayarit, Sinaloa and in south Zacatecas.

Description
The cactus grows in groups, and grow up to 8 inches tall. They form large red flowers that range from 5.5 to 6 centimeters in diameter.

References

Plants described in 1850
senilis